Entente frugale is the cooperation between the British and French governments, particularly in military procurement, which is driven by cost constraints, which was announced in November 2010 as part of the Lancaster House Treaties.

The name is a wry reference to the Entente Cordiale of 1904.

Together, France and the United Kingdom accounted for half of all military spending in the European Union in 2010 and two thirds of research and development.

Proposed activities
Combined Joint Expeditionary Force, with land, sea, and air components
Cooperation on the Future Strategic Tanker Aircraft: The French armed forces may pay to use an Airbus A330 MRTT if there is spare capacity.
Possible cooperation in Afghanistan
Cooperation on aircraft carriers: Interoperability improvements, so warplanes from either country (F-35B Joint Strike Fighters and French navy's Dassault Rafales) could use each other's aircraft carriers.
Joint development of new technologies for nuclear submarines
Shared support for A400M fleets, including training
Sharing of military communications satellites
Cyber security
Mine countermeasures
Coordination of nuclear tests, and cooperation between AWE Aldermaston and CEA Valduc.
Unmanned air vehicles, including the BAE/Dassault Telemos

See also
British Armed Forces
French Armed Forces

References

External links
 UK–France Summit 2010 Declaration on Defence and Security Co-operation

British defence policymaking
Military of France
France–United Kingdom military relations